Benjamin is an unincorporated community in Lewis County, in the U.S. state of Missouri.

History
A post office called Benjamin was established in 1869, and remained in operation until 1926. The community has the name of John F. Benjamin, a state legislator.

References

Unincorporated communities in Lewis County, Missouri
Unincorporated communities in Missouri